Several ships of the Confederate States Navy have borne the name CSS Georgia, after Georgia:

 ,  a screw steamer acquired in 1863, and captured by the Union Navy in 1864
 , an ironclad warship built in 1862 and decommissioned in 1864

See also
 
 
 Georgia (disambiguation)

Ship names